Adolf Hitler, chancellor and dictator of Germany from 1933 to 1945, died by suicide via gunshot on 30 April 1945 in the  in Berlin after it became clear that Germany would lose the Battle of Berlin, which led to the end of World War II in Europe. Eva Braun, his wife of one day, also died by suicide, taking cyanide. In accordance with Hitler's prior written and verbal instructions, that afternoon their remains were carried up the stairs and through the bunker's emergency exit to the Reich Chancellery garden, where they were doused in petrol and burned. The news of Hitler's death was announced on German radio the next day, 1 May.

Eyewitnesses who saw Hitler's body immediately after his suicide testified that he died from a self-inflicted gunshot, which has been established to have been a shot to the temple. Otto Günsche, Hitler's personal adjutant, who handled both bodies, testified that while Braun's smelled strongly of burnt almondsan indication of cyanide poisoningthere was no such odour about Hitler's body, which smelled of gunpowder. Dental remains extracted from the soil in the garden were matched with Hitler's dental records in May 1945. The dental remains were later confirmed as being Hitler's.

The Soviet Union restricted the release of information and released many conflicting reports about Hitler's death. Historians have largely rejected these as part of a deliberate disinformation campaign by Joseph Stalin to sow confusion regarding Hitler's death, or have attempted to reconcile them. Soviet records allege that the burnt remains of Hitler and Braun were recovered, despite eyewitness accounts that they were almost completely reduced to ashes. In June 1945, the Soviets began seeding two contradictory narratives: that Hitler died by taking cyanide and that he had survived and fled to another country. Following extensive review, West Germany issued a death certificate in 1956. Conspiracy theories about Hitler's death continue to attract interest.

Preceding events 

By early 1945, Nazi Germany was on the verge of total military collapse. Poland had fallen to the advancing Soviet Red Army, which was preparing to cross the Oder between Küstrin and Frankfurt-an-der-Oder with the objective of capturing Berlin  to the west. German forces had recently lost to the Allies in the Ardennes Offensive, with British and Canadian forces crossing the Rhine into the German industrial heartland of the Ruhr. U.S. forces in the south had captured Lorraine and were advancing towards Mainz, Mannheim, and the Rhine. German forces in Italy were withdrawing north, as they were pressed by the U.S. and Commonwealth forces as part of the Spring Offensive to advance across the Po and into the foothills of the Alps.

Hitler retreated to his Führerbunker in Berlin on 16 January 1945. It was clear to the Nazi leadership that the battle for Berlin would be the final battle of the war in Europe. Some 325,000 soldiers of Germany's Army Group B were surrounded and captured in the Ruhr Pocket on 18 April, leaving the path open for U.S. forces to reach Berlin. By 11 April, the Americans crossed the Elbe,  to the west of the city. On 16 April, Soviet forces to the east crossed the Oder and commenced the battle for the Seelow Heights, the last major defensive line protecting Berlin on that side. By 19 April, the Germans were in full retreat from Seelow Heights, leaving no front line. Berlin was bombarded by Soviet artillery for the first time on 20 April, Hitler's birthday. By the evening of 21 April, Red Army tanks reached the outskirts of the city.

On 21 April, Hitler ordered a special detachment commanded by SS-General Felix Steiner to counterattack the Soviets. At the next day's afternoon situation conference, Hitler suffered a nervous collapse when he was informed that these orders had not been obeyed. He launched into a tirade against his generals, calling them treacherous and incompetent, culminating in a declarationfor the first timethat the war was lost. Hitler announced that he would stay in Berlin until the end and then shoot himself. Later that day, he asked SS physician Werner Haase about the most reliable method of suicide. Haase suggested the "pistol-and-poison method" of combining a dose of cyanide with a gunshot to the head. Luftwaffe chief  Hermann Göring learned about Hitler's admission of defeat and declaration of his intended suicide and sent a telegram to Hitler, asking for permission to take over the leadership of the Reich in accordance with Hitler's 1941 decree naming him as his successor. Hitler's secretary Martin Bormann convinced Hitler that the letter from Göring was an attempt to overthrow the dictator. In response, Hitler informed Göring that he would be executed unless he resigned all of his posts. Later that day, he sacked Göring from all of his offices and ordered his arrest. Hitler also ordered his chief aide and adjutant, Julius Schaub, to destroy safeguarded documents and his personal train.

By 27 April, Berlin's communication had been all but cut off from the rest of Germany. Secure radio contact with defending units had been lost; the command staff in the  had to depend on telephone lines for passing instructions and orders, and on public radio for news and information. On 28 April, Hitler received a BBC report originating from Reuters: it stated that  Heinrich Himmler had offered to surrender to the Western Allies. The offer was declined. Himmler had implied to the Allies that he had the authority to negotiate a surrender, which Hitler considered to be treason. That afternoon, Hitler's anger and bitterness escalated into a rage against Himmler. He ordered Himmler's arrest and had Hermann Fegelein (Himmler's SS representative at Hitler's headquarters) shot for desertion.

By this time, the Red Army had advanced to the Potsdamer Platz, roughly a kilometre away from the bunker, and all indications were that they were preparing to storm the Reich Chancellery. This report and Himmler's treachery prompted Hitler to make the last decisions of his life. The two then hosted a modest wedding breakfast, after which Hitler took secretary Traudl Junge to another room and dictated his last will and testament. It left instructions to be carried out immediately following his death, with Grand Admiral Karl Dönitz and Joseph Goebbels assuming Hitler's roles as head of state and chancellor, respectively. Hitler signed these documents at 04:00 and then went to bed. Some sources say that he dictated the last will and testament immediately before the wedding, but all agree on the timing of the signing.

On the afternoon of 29 April, Hitler learned that his ally, Benito Mussolini, had been executed by Italian partisans. The bodies of Mussolini and his mistress, Clara Petacci, had been strung up by their heels. The corpses were later cut down and thrown into the gutter, where they were mocked by Italian dissidents. These events may have strengthened Hitler's resolve not to allow himself or his wife to be made a "spectacle" of, as he had earlier recorded in his testament. Hitler had been given some capsules of prussic acid by Himmler through SS physician Ludwig Stumpfegger, and initially had intended to use them for his suicide. But when he received the news that Himmler had contacted the Allies through a Swedish diplomat to arrange for an end to the war, Hitler was outraged. With this betrayal in his mind, Hitler began to doubt whether the ampoules would be effective. He ordered Haase to test one on his dog Blondi. The capsule workedthe dog died instantly.

Suicide 
Hitler and Braun lived together as husband and wife in the bunker for less than 40 hours. By 01:00 on 30 April, Field Marshal Wilhelm Keitel had reported that all of the forces on which Hitler had been depending to rescue Berlin had either been encircled or forced onto the defensive. At around 02:30, Hitler appeared in the corridor where about twenty people, mostly women, were assembled to give their farewells. He went down the line, shaking hands and speaking with each of them, before retiring to his quarters. Weidling told Hitler that the garrison would probably run out of ammunition that night, and that the fighting in Berlin would inevitably come to an end within the next 24 hours. Weidling asked for permission for a break-out; this was a request he had unsuccessfully made before. Hitler did not answer, and Weidling went back to his headquarters in the Bendlerblock. At about 13:00, he received Hitler's permission to attempt a break-out that night. Hitler, two secretaries, and his personal cook then had lunch, after which Hitler and Braun said goodbye to members of the bunker staff and fellow occupants, including Bormann, Goebbels, the secretaries, and several military officers. At around 14:30 Adolf and Eva Hitler went into his personal study. Hitler's adjutant SS-Sturmbannführer Otto Günsche stood guard outside the study door.

After some time, Hitler's valet, Heinz Linge, entered the antechamber to Hitler's quarters, where he discovered the door closed and could smell gunpowder smoke. Linge went back out to the corridor where Bormann was standing, and the two then entered the study together. Linge later stated that while in the room he immediately noted a scent of burnt almonds, which is a common observation in the presence of hydrogen cyanide. Linge saw the bodies of Hitler and Braun sitting upright on the sofa, with Hitler to Braun's right. His head was canted to his right. Günsche entered the study shortly afterwards. He described Braun's corpse as being on Hitler's left, with her legs drawn up and slumped away from him. Günsche stated that Hitler "sat ... sunken over, with blood dripping out of his right temple. He had shot himself with his own pistol, a Walther PPK 7.65." The gun lay at his feet. Hitler's dripping blood had made a large stain on the right arm of the sofa and was pooling on the rug. According to Linge, Braun's body had no visible wounds, and her face showed how she had diedfrom cyanide poisoning. Günsche and SS- Wilhelm Mohnke stated "unequivocally" that all outsiders and those performing duties and work in the bunker "did not have any access" to Hitler's private living quarters during the time of death (between 15:00 and 16:00).

Günsche left the study and announced that Hitler was dead to a group in the briefing room, which included Goebbels, Krebs, and General Wilhelm Burgdorf. These three, in addition to others including Hitler Youth leader Artur Axmann, viewed the bodies. Linge and another man rolled up Hitler's body in a rug, and then, in accordance with Hitler's prior written and verbal instructions, his and Braun's bodies were carried up the stairs and through the bunker's emergency exit to the garden behind the Reich Chancellery, where they were to be burned with petrol. Although Hitler's corpse was partially covered by the rug, numerous witnesses testified to recognising him, as the top of his head was not covered, nor were his lower legs and feet.

After the first attempts to ignite the petrol did not work, Linge went back inside the bunker and returned with a thick roll of papers. Bormann lit the papers and threw them onto the bodies. As the two corpses caught fire, a group including Bormann, Günsche, Linge, Goebbels, Erich Kempka, Peter Högl, Ewald Lindloff, and Hans Reisser raised their arms in salute as they stood just inside the bunker doorway.

At around 16:15, Linge ordered SS- Heinz Krüger and SS- Werner Schwiedel to roll up the rug in Hitler's study to burn it. Schwiedel later stated that upon entering the study, he saw a pool of blood the size of a "large dinner plate" by the arm-rest of the sofa. Noticing a spent cartridge case, he bent down and picked it up from where it lay on the rug about 1 mm from a 7.65 pistol. The two men removed the blood-stained rug and carried it up the stairs and outside to the Chancellery garden, where it was placed on the ground and burned.

The Red Army shelled the area in and around the Reich Chancellery on and off during the afternoon. SS guards brought over additional cans of petrol to further burn the corpses. Although the corpses were being burned in the open, where the distribution of heat varies (as opposed to in a crematorium), according to eyewitnesses, the copious amount of fuel applied from about 16:00 to 18:30 reduced the remains to something between charred bones and piles of ashes which fell apart to the touch. At approximately 18:30, Lindloff (and perhaps Reisser) covered up the ashen remains in a shallow bomb crater. The shelling and a fire from napalm incendiary bombs continued until 2 May. During this period it was difficult to spend any time in the garden because of the continuous shelling.

Aftermath 

General Hans Krebs met Soviet General Vasily Chuikov just prior to 04:00 on 1 May, giving him the news of Hitler's death, while attempting to negotiate a ceasefire and open "peace negotiations". Joseph Stalin was informed of Hitler's suicide around 04:05 Berlin time, thirteen hours after the event. He demanded unconditional surrender, which Krebs lacked authorisation to give. Stalin wanted confirmation that Hitler was dead and ordered the Red Army's counterespionage unit, SMERSH, to find his corpse.

The first inkling to the outside world that Hitler was dead came from the Germans themselves. On the night of 1 May, the  radio station interrupted their normal program to announce that Hitler had died that afternoon, and introduced his successor, President Karl Dönitz. Dönitz called upon the German people to mourn their Führer, whom he stated had died a hero defending the capital of the Reich. Hoping to save the army and the nation by negotiating a partial surrender to the British and Americans, Dönitz authorised a fighting withdrawal to the west. His tactic was somewhat successful: it enabled about 1.8 million German soldiers to avoid capture by the Soviets, but came at a high cost in bloodshed, as troops continued to fight until 8 May.

In the early morning hours of 2 May, the Soviets captured the Reich Chancellery. In early May, Hitler's and Braun's dental remains were extracted from the soil. Stalin was wary of believing Hitler was dead and restricted the release of information to the public. By 11 May, dental assistant Käthe Heusermann and dental technician Fritz Echtmann, both of whom had worked for Hitler's dentist Hugo Blaschke, identified the dental remains of Hitler and Braun. Both would spend years in Soviet prisons. An alleged Soviet autopsy of Hitler made public in 1968 was used by forensic odontologists Reidar F. Sognnaes and Ferdinand Strøm to confirm the authenticity of Hitler's dental remains in 1972. In 2017, French forensic pathologist Philippe Charlier also found the dental remains in the Soviet archives, including teeth on part of a jawbone, to be in "perfect agreement" with X-rays taken of Hitler in 1944. Charlier used electron microscopy to examine the tartar, which contained only plant fibres, a detail consistent with Hitler's vegetarianism. A 2018 paper co-authored by Charlier concludes that these remains "cannot be a fake", citing their significant wear. No gunpowder residue was detected, indicating that Hitler did not die by a gunshot wound through the mouth.

In early June 1945, SMERSH moved the remains of several individuals, including the Goebbels family (Joseph, Magda, and their children), from Buch to Finow. Hitler and Braun's remains were alleged to have been moved as well, but this is most likely Soviet disinformation. There is no evidence that any bodily remains of Hitler or Braunwith the exception of the dental remainswere found by the Soviets. By 1970, the facility was under KGB control and scheduled to be relinquished to East Germany. Concerned that a known Nazi burial site might become a neo-Nazi shrine, KGB director Yuri Andropov authorised an operation to exhume and destroy the decaying remains. On 4 April 1970, a KGB team thoroughly cremated them and cast the ashes into the Biederitz river, a tributary of the nearby Elbe.

For politically motivated reasons, the Soviet Union presented various versions of Hitler's fate. On 5 June, the Soviets claimed that his body had been examined and that he had died by cyanide poisoning. At a press conference on 9 June, the Soviets said they had not actually identified the body and that Hitler had likely escaped. When asked in July 1945 how Hitler had died, Stalin said he was living "in Spain or Argentina". In November 1945, Dick White, the head of counter-intelligence in the British sector of Berlin, had their agent Hugh Trevor-Roper investigate. His report was expanded and published in 1947 as The Last Days of Hitler. In the years immediately after the war, the Soviets maintained that Hitler was not dead, but had escaped and was either being shielded by the former Western Allies, was in Francoist Spain, or was somewhere in South America.

Until the mid-1950s, the U.S. Federal Bureau of Investigation and Central Intelligence Agency received many leads claiming that Hitler might still be alive, while giving none of them credence. The documents remained classified until the early 2010s, as authorised by the 1998 Nazi War Crimes Disclosure Act. The secrecy in which the investigation was shrouded helped fuel conspiracy theories asserting Hitler's survival. Presiding judge at the Einsatzgruppen trial at Nuremberg Michael Musmanno considered all such claims contrary to the evidence.

Between 1948 and 1952, amid denazification proceedings in West Germany, legal disputes over Hitler's former property (including The Art of Painting by Johannes Vermeer) were hindered by the lack of an official death declaration. Beginning in 1952, a federal court in Berchtesgaden interviewed 42 witnesses about Hitler's suicidebehind closed doors to avoid testimonies influencing one another. After four years of extensive review, Judge Heinrich Stephanus concluded: "There can no longer be the slightest doubt that on 30 April 1945 Adolf Hitler put an end to his life in the Chancellery by his own hand, by means of a shot into his right temple." A death certificate was issued on 25 February 1956, with an attached report of more than 1,500 pages. An 80-page expert criminological report was prepared in mid-1956, focusing on the "substantial discrepancies" between eyewitness testimonies and serving as a springboard for photographic reconstructions. Ballistic experiments were arranged to determine which interpretation of the fatal gunshot was most likely. The declaration became public and legally binding by the year's end. Hitler's demise was entered as an assumption of death on the basis that none of the witnesses had seen his body, which German historian Anton Joachimsthalerwho cites some of the testimonies in his book on the dictator's deathpoints out is incorrect. The federal court went on to publish a summary of its findings of fact in a 1958 press release.

Further Soviet investigations and disinformation
On 11 December 1945, the Soviets allowed a limited investigation of the bunker complex grounds by the other Allied powers (Britain, France, and the U.S.). Two representatives from each nation watched several Germans dig up soil down to the concrete roof of the bunker; the excavation included the bomb crater where Hitler's burnt remains had been buried. Found during the dig were two hats identified as Hitler's, an undergarment with Braun's initials, and some reports to Hitler from Goebbels.  The Soviet People's Commissariat for Internal Affairs (NKVD) barred further excavation on the accusation that the representatives had removed documents from the Reich Chancellery.

At the end of 1945, Stalin ordered the NKVD to form a second commission to investigate Hitler's death. On 30 May 1946, agents of the NKVD's successor, the Ministry of Internal Affairs (MVD), found part of a skull in the crater where Hitler's remains had been exhumed. The remnant consists of part of the occipital bone and part of both parietal bones. The nearly complete left parietal bone has a bullet hole, apparently an exit wound. This remained uncatalogued until 1975, and was rediscovered in the Russian State Archives in 1993. In 2009, University of Connecticut archaeologist and bone specialist Nick Bellantoni examined the skull fragment, which Soviet officials believed to be Hitler's. According to Bellantoni, "The bone seemed very thin" for a male, and "the sutures where the skull plates come together seemed to correspond to someone under 40". A small piece detached from the skull was DNA-tested, as was blood from Hitler's sofa. The skull was determined to be that of a woman, while the blood was confirmed to belong to a male.

Western historians were allowed into the archives of the former Soviet Union beginning in 1991, but the dossier remained undiscovered for twelve years; in 2005, it was published as The Hitler Book.

In 1968, Soviet journalist Lev Bezymenski published his book, The Death of Adolf Hitler, which includes previously unreleased photographs of the dental remains. The book transcribes a purported Soviet forensic examination led by Faust Shkaravsky, which concluded that Hitler died by cyanide poisoning. The book and alleged autopsy have been widely derided by Western historians. Joachimsthaler, in his extensive analysis of the circumstances surrounding Hitler's death, quotes a German pathologist as saying about the purported autopsy: "Bezemensky's report is ridiculous. ... Any one of my assistants would have done better ... the whole thing is a farce ... it is intolerably bad work ... the transcript of the post-mortem section of 8 [May] 1945 describes anything but Hitler." Journalist James P. O'Donnell corrects the book's claim that cyanide acts instantaneously, saying Hitler could have taken poison and still had enough time to shoot himself.

Legacy 
After Hitler's death and the subsequent end of World War II in Europe, Germany was divided into four zones by the victorious Allies, who occupied the country. This led to the start of the Cold War between the Western Bloc, supported by the US, and the Eastern Bloc, supported by the Soviet Union. The divide was for a time physically represented by the Berlin Wall, and was eventually followed by Germany's reunification in 1990 and the fall of the Iron Curtain in 1991.

Following Hitler's death, war veteran and future American president John F. Kennedy wrote in his diary that the dictator "had a mystery about him in the way he lived and in the manner of his death that will live and grow after him". Historian Joachim Fest opines that the almost "traceless" death of Hitler allowed him to stay in the public eye, granting him a "bizarre afterlife"; conspiracy theoriesrooted in Soviet disinformation alleging his survivalbolstered continued doubts and speculation, including outlandish tabloid and journalistic reports published into the late 20th century. Conspiracy theories about Hitler's death and about the Nazi era as a whole still attract interest, with books, TV shows, and films continuing to be produced on the topic. Historian Luke Daly-Groves wrote that Hitler's death is not about the death of one man, but carries a greater significance as to the end of the regime and the ideological impact it left behind.

Gallery

See also

References

Informational notes

Citations

Bibliography

Further reading

Books

Articles

 
 
 
 
 

April 1945 events in Europe
Battle of Berlin
 
Deaths by person in Germany
People declared dead in absentia
Suicides in Germany
1945 suicides